Sorsogon Bay is a bay in the Bicol Peninsula , located on Luzon island in the Philippines. It is completely surrounded by the province of Sorsogon. The municipalities of Pilar, Juban, Casiguran, Sorsogon City, Castilla and Magallanes are located along its shores.

Bays of the Philippines
Sorsogon City
Landforms of Sorsogon